Ďolíček Stadium is a multi-purpose stadium in Prague district Vršovice, Czech Republic.  It is currently used mostly for football matches and is the home ground of Bohemians Praha 1905 and FK Pardubice. The stadium was opened on 27 March 1932 for a match against SK Slavia Prague. The reconstruction of 2003 changed the capacity to 13,388 (3,028 seated). After reconstruction in summer 2007, its capacity was reduced to 9,000 (3,800 seated). Bohemians 1905 were not allowed to keep the stand sector, they changed it into seats, which reduced the capacity further, to 7,500 (all seated).

In the 2010–11 and 2011–12 seasons, Bohemians played its home matches at Synot Tip Arena, and Ďolíček was only used for the Bohemians 1905 "B" team.

In 2011, councillors of the city district of Prague 10 approved a proposal to purchase the stadium.

Transport
The stadium is served by trams, the local stop immediately south of Ďolíček, formerly known as Oblouková, was renamed Bohemians in September 2012. Services 7 and 24 serve the stop. Another stop, Vršovické náměstí, north of the site, is served by tram services 4 and 22. The Praha-Vršovice railway station is around ten minutes' walk from the stadium.

References

External links 
 Information at Bohemians 1905 website
 English-language history of the venue

Czech First League venues
Football venues in Prague
Multi-purpose stadiums in the Czech Republic
Bohemians 1905
Sports venues completed in 1932
1932 establishments in Czechoslovakia
20th-century architecture in the Czech Republic